Claughton (previously Cathcart-Claughton-Cleveland, 1973 to 1979) is a Wirral Metropolitan Borough Council ward in the Birkenhead Parliamentary constituency.

Councillors

Notes
• italics denote a sitting councillor • bold denotes the winning candidate

References

Wards of Merseyside
Birkenhead
Politics of the Metropolitan Borough of Wirral
Wards of the Metropolitan Borough of Wirral